José Manuel Rueda Sampedro (born 30 January 1988) is a Spanish footballer who plays for CD Olímpic de Xàtiva as a midfielder.

Club career
Rueda was born in Linares, Jaén, Andalusia. After arriving in FC Barcelona's youth system at the age of 13, he played three years with the B-team, two of those in the third division. On 17 May 2008 he made his La Liga debut, coming on as a substitute for Eiður Guðjohnsen for the final 15 minutes of a 5–3 away win against Real Murcia – in the season's last round – with the title race already decided in the Catalans' favour.

In 2009–10, Rueda was one of the most important attacking players of the reserve side led by former Barcelona player Luis Enrique, scoring four goals as they returned to the second level after an 11-year absence. During the campaign, he was also named team captain.

In June 2010, alongside two other compatriots, including former Barcelona B teammate Víctor Espasandín, Rueda signed with Cypriot club AC Omonia. He won the league in his first and only season before returning to his country's division two with Xerez CD, being relegated in 2013.

On 14 June 2013, Rueda moved to fellow league club SD Ponferradina on a one-year deal. He in fact stayed for two, before leaving abroad for a second time on 13 July 2015 and joining Morocco's Moghreb Tétouan alongside compatriot Jesús Tato.

In January 2017, Rueda signed for his hometown team Linares Deportivo in the third tier.

Club statistics

Honours
Omonia
Cypriot Cup: 2010–11
Cypriot Super Cup: 2010

References

External links
 
 
 
 

1988 births
Living people
People from Linares, Jaén
Sportspeople from the Province of Jaén (Spain)
Spanish footballers
Footballers from Andalusia
Association football midfielders
La Liga players
Segunda División players
Segunda División B players
Tercera División players
FC Barcelona Atlètic players
FC Barcelona players
Xerez CD footballers
SD Ponferradina players
CD Olímpic de Xàtiva footballers
Cypriot First Division players
AC Omonia players
Botola players
Moghreb Tétouan players
Spain youth international footballers
Spanish expatriate footballers
Expatriate footballers in Cyprus
Expatriate footballers in Morocco
Spanish expatriate sportspeople in Cyprus
Spanish expatriate sportspeople in Morocco